The Highwater Rock is located in the Cedar River near downtown Cedar Rapids, Iowa, United States. It is a large granite boulder in the rapids in the eastern half of the river. Its height depends on the river level. It was used to gauge the river depth from the 1840s to the close of river navigation in the mid-1860s. In the early days, people could cross the river at the rapids on horseback, on foot, or by wagon and buggy. They would use the rock to determine if it was safe for them to cross. After David W. King began ferry service in 1848 and a toll bridge was built, people would use the rock to determine if the water was low enough to cross the river and avoid paying the tolls. King would use the rock to determine the amount of cargo he could carry or if he could run the ferry at all. After steam navigation was established on the river the steamer pilots would use the rock to determine if they could continue past the rapids. Railroads severely curtailed the use of steamboats on the Cedar River, and in 1870 the United States Congress declared the river was not navigable above Columbus Junction, which is well below Cedar Rapids. This put an end to water transportation on this part of the river, and the usefulness of the rock. It was listed on the National Register of Historic Places in 1977.

References

National Register of Historic Places in Cedar Rapids, Iowa
Transportation on the National Register of Historic Places in Iowa